Tijana Milojević (born 10 September 1998) is a Belgian-born Serbian volleyball player. She plays for the Chinese Volleyball Super League side Shenzhen Phoenix. She was a member of Serbia U18 national volleyball team who earned silver medal in both Girls' Youth European Volleyball Championship and European Youth Olympic Festival in 2015.

Career
Tijana grew up in Crvena zvezda, where she passed all the younger categories. After five years spent studying in the USA and playing for Seattle University, Tijana returned to her home club, Crvena zvezda.

National Team

Youth U18
In 2015, Milojević represented Serbia U18 national volleyball team completing the 2015 Girls' Youth European Volleyball Championship which held from 28 March to 5 April. The team reached final beating the likes of Italy and Germany, but lost to Russia in five sets. Despite the lost, she was awarded the best libero in the competition. Three months later, Serbia U18 entered the final again in 2015 European Youth Summer Olympic Festival, but once more fell short in five sets. The match took place on 1 August. Their opponent Turkey led the game by 2-0. Milojević's team won the next two sets, but eventually lost the last set by 8-15.

After qualified through Girls' Youth European Volleyball Championship, Milojević participated with the team in the 2015 FIVB Volleyball Girls' U18 World Championship from 7 August to 16 August. Unfortunately, they lost to eventual winner Italy in the quarterfinals and gained a 5th place overall.

Junior U19
In 2016, Milojević was selected in Serbia U19 squad at the 2016 Women's U19 Volleyball European Championship. Serbia earned Silver medal after lost to Russia 0-3 in the final.

Awards

Individual
2015 Girls' Youth European Volleyball Championship Best Libero
2016 Junior Women Balkan Volleyball Championship Best Libero

National team

Youth U18
  2015 Youth Girls Balkan Volleyball Championship 
  2015 Girls' Youth European Volleyball Championship
  2015 European Youth Summer Olympic Festival

Junior U19
  2016 Junior Women Balkan Volleyball Championship 
  2016 Women's U19 Volleyball European Championship

References

External links
 Player profile in Girls' U18 World Championship 2015
 Scoresway player passport
 Worldofvolley player profile

1998 births
Living people
People from Asse
Sportspeople from Belgrade
Belgian women's volleyball players
Serbian women's volleyball players
Belgian people of Serbian descent
Belgian expatriates in the United States
Serbian expatriate sportspeople in the United States
Belgian expatriates in China
Serbian expatriate sportspeople in China
Expatriate volleyball players in the United States
Expatriate volleyball players in China
Seattle Redhawks athletes